West Point Township is one of twenty-four townships in Bates County, Missouri, and is part of the Kansas City metropolitan area within the USA.  As of the 2000 census, its population was 573.

West Point Township took its name from the community of West Point, which is now considered a ghost town.

Geography
According to the United States Census Bureau, West Point Township covers an area of 33 square miles (85.46 square kilometers); of this, 32.88 square miles (85.15 square kilometers, 99.64 percent) is land and 0.12 square miles (0.31 square kilometers, 0.36 percent) is water.

Cities, towns, villages
 Amsterdam

Adjacent townships
 West Boone Township (north)
 East Boone Township (northeast)
 Elkhart Township (east)
 Charlotte Township (southeast)
 Homer Township (south)
 Lincoln Township, Linn County, Kansas (west)
 Sugar Creek Township, Miami County, Kansas (northwest)

Cemeteries
The township contains these three cemeteries: Forbes, Walley and West Point.

Landmarks
 City Park

School districts
 Miami R-I

Political districts
 Missouri's 4th congressional district
 State House District 125
 State Senate District 31

References
 United States Census Bureau 2008 TIGER/Line Shapefiles
 United States Board on Geographic Names (GNIS)
 United States National Atlas

External links
 US-Counties.com
 City-Data.com

Townships in Bates County, Missouri
Townships in Missouri